Fluorescence cross-correlation spectroscopy (FCCS) was introduced by Eigen and Rigler in 1994 and experimentally realized by Schwille in 1997. It is essentially an extension of the fluorescence correlation spectroscopy (FCS) procedure by utilizing two differentially colored molecules, instead of one. In other words, coincident green and red intensity fluctuations of distinct molecules correlate if green and red labeled particles are moving together through a predefined confocal volume. As a result, FCCS provides a highly sensitive measurement of molecular interactions independent of diffusion rate. This is an important advancement, given that diffusion rate depends only weakly on the size of the molecular complex. FCCS utilizes two species which are independently labeled with two differently colored fluorescent probes. These fluorescent probes are excited and detected by two different laser light sources and detectors usually labeled as "green" and "red". Typically a confocal microscope is used to provide overlapping green and red focal volumes for excitation.  

In the absence of spectral bleed-through, the cross-correlation function is zero for non-interacting particles. In contrast to FCS, the cross-correlation function increases with increasing numbers of interacting particles.

FCCS is primarily utilized for measurements of bio-molecular interactions both in living cells and in vitro.  It can be utilized to measure simple molecular stoichiometries and binding constants.  It is one of the few techniques that can provide information about protein-protein interactions at a specific time and location within a living cell.  In contrast to fluorescence resonance energy transfer, it does not have a distance limit for interactions.  As a result, it can be utilized to probe large complexes.  Nevertheless, it does require that complexes be actively diffusing through the microscope focus on a relatively short time scale (typically seconds).

Modeling
Cross-correlation curves are modeled according to a slightly more complicated mathematical function than applied in FCS. First of all, the effective superimposed observation volume in which the G and R channels form a single observation volume,  in the solution:

The diffusion time,  for a doubly (G and R) fluorescent species is therefore described as follows:

where  is the diffusion coefficient of the doubly fluorescent particle.

The cross-correlation curve generated from diffusing doubly labelled fluorescent particles can be modelled in separate channels as follows:

In the ideal case, the cross-correlation function is proportional to the concentration of the doubly labeled fluorescent complex:

with 

The cross-correlation amplitude is directly proportional to the concentration of double-labeled (red and green) species

See also
Dynamic light scattering
Fluorescence spectroscopy
Diffusion coefficient

References

External links
Fluorescence Cross Correlation (FCCS) (Becker & Hickl GmbH, web page)

Spectroscopy
Physical chemistry
Fluorescence techniques
Biochemistry methods